Nicola Furlong is a Canadian novelist who lives in Sidney, British Columbia.

Works
Teed Off! - 1996
A Hemorrhaging of Souls - 1998
The Nervous Nephew - 2000
The Angel's Secret - 2001
The Unsuitable Suitor - 2001
No Safe Arbor - 2001

References

Canadian women novelists
Living people
20th-century Canadian novelists
21st-century Canadian novelists
Writers from British Columbia
Year of birth missing (living people)
Place of birth missing (living people)
20th-century Canadian women writers
21st-century Canadian women writers